The women's high jump event  at the 1973 European Athletics Indoor Championships was held on 11 March in Rotterdam.

Results

References

High jump at the European Athletics Indoor Championships
High